Hlubočany is a municipality and village in Vyškov District in the South Moravian Region of the Czech Republic. It has about 500 inhabitants.

Administrative parts
The village of Terešov is an administrative part of Hlubočany.

History
The first written mention of Hlubočany is from 1141.

Until 1945, Hlubočany and Terešov belonged to the German-speaking enclave called Vyškov Language Island. The area was colonized by German settlers in the second half of the 13th century. The coexistence of Czechs and Germans was mostly peaceful, which changed only after 1935, when many Germans tended to Nazism. In 1945, the German population was expelled and the municipality was resettled by Czech families.

References

Villages in Vyškov District